Lehndorf-Watenbüttel is a Stadtbezirk (borough) in the northwestern part of Braunschweig, Germany. The Stadtbezirk comprises the quarters Kanzlerfeld, Lamme, Lehndorf, Ölper, Völkenrode, and Watenbüttel.

History
The district consists of several villages that were incorporated into Braunschweig during the 20th century, in 1934 (Lehndorf and Ölper) and in 1974 (Lamme, Völkenrode, and Wattenbüttel), as well as the Kanzlerfeld, a new quarter built in the 1960s.

Politics

The district mayor Frank Graffstedt is a member of the Social Democratic Party of Germany.

Coats of arms

References

Boroughs and quarters of Braunschweig